Findlay (born 7 June 1991), real name Natalie Rose Findlay, is an English musician originally from Stockport, England.

Early life
Findlay started playing the guitar when she was around 15 and after about a year began writing songs. She took up music for the simple fact that she was not interested in anything else growing up. She joked that "[she] can't really do anything else."

Music career

2008–2014: Polydor
On 24 November 2013, Findlay released her second EP Greasy Love. However, after disagreements with her record label, Polydor, Findlay was granted a release from her contract with the company.

2015–2016: BMG
Findlay soon created her own label Mint Records and signed with BMG. On 9 February 2015 the video for the single "Electric Bones" was released online and the Electric Bones EP was released digitally on 4 September 2015. In March 2015 Findlay released the single "Wolfback" which samples from the Ratatat song "Loud Pipes". The video for "Junk Food" premiered on 4 November 2015 on Clash.

2017–2018: Forgotten Pleasures
To start off 2017, the single "Waste My Time" was released in January, followed by the release of Findlay's debut studio album Forgotten Pleasures on 3 March 2017.

2019–present: The Last Of The 20th Century Girls and Ttrruuces
In June 2019, Findlay announced she was working on her second studio album via Instagram post. In 2019, she also started a new project called Ttrruuces along with her debut album's co-producer Jules Apollinaire. Their self-titled debut album was released on 26 June 2020.

In September 2021, Findlay released her new single "Life is but a Dream".

Findlay released her second studio album, Last Of The 20th Century Girls, on May 13, 2022.

Discography

Studio albums

EPs

Singles

Featured Artist

Touring 
Along with performing at major festival stages, Findlay has toured in support of such notable acts as Jake Bugg, the Courteeners, Brandon Flowers and Miles Kane.

Findlay made her United States debut on 12 March 2018 in Los Angeles. She also played at several 2018 SXSW showcases.

In other media 

 
 2015: "Greasy Love", featured in season three premiere episode of the Cinemax drama, Banshee.

 
 2018: "Waste My Time", featured in an episode of Stan's TV series Younger
 2018: "Stoned and Alone", featured in "The Precious Blood of Jesus", an episode of Netflix's Ozark
 2018: "Off & On", As part of the soundtrack for the Konami Sports-related videogame Pro Evolution Soccer

Official Videos

Personal life
Findlay's current residence is in Hackney, East London. She is a vegetarian and speaks French. She has been in a relationship with her TTRRUUCES bandmate Jules Apollinaire since 2014.

References

External links
Official Site

1991 births
Living people
English women singer-songwriters
Musicians from Manchester
21st-century English women singers
21st-century English singers